The Church of St. Mary Magdalene, Bridgnorth, is a parish Church in the Church of England, standing in East Castle Street, Bridgnorth.

Early history

The College of St. Mary Magdalen, Bridgnorth was founded as a royal free chapel, and its church was in the royal castle at Bridgnorth.

The nave, chancel and western tower were probably built c. 1238, and a north aisle was added, presumably after 1294, when a chantry service was founded in St. Mary's by Richard Dammas. As a Collegiate church it was originally intended as a private chapel for the castle, but by the later 15th century it was being used as a parish church.

The college of canons was dissolved in 1548.

The Deans of Bridgnorth

The current building

The church was designed by Thomas Telford and built by John Rhodes and Michael Head between 1792 and 1795.

The church is aligned north–south, rather than the more usual west–east. The tower stands 120 ft high, and it has a clock, eight bells and a copper-covered roof.
 
The parish's war memorial is a wooden triptych with a crucifix in the centre, above the Latin mottos "AMOR VINCIT" (Love conquers) and the town motto, "FIDELITAS URBIS SALUS REGIS" (In the town's loyalty lies the safety of the King) and listing its war dead from both World Wars.

Organ

The church has a magnificent Father Willis organ, purchased from Clifton College, Bristol

Organists

 William John Roberts (Professor of Music and Organist) 1865 - c1880
 
Arthur C Clarke 1939 - 1972
Harold Cooper 1972 - 2002
John Turnock

Bells
The church has 8 bells, the heaviest weighing just over 8 cwt. These are usually rung twice weekly: on Wednesday practice night (7:30 pm – 9:00 pm) and for the main service on a Sunday morning (10:00 am – 10:30 am). Additionally, they are sometimes rung for weddings.

References

Sources
The buildings of England, Shropshire. Nikolaus Pevsner.
Civil Engineering Heritage, by Roger Cragg
Colleges of secular canons: Bridgnorth, St Mary Magdalen, A History of the County of Shropshire: Volume 2 (1973), pp. 123–128.

Bridgnorth
Diocese of Hereford
Churches completed in 1795
18th-century Church of England church buildings
Former collegiate churches in England
Works of Thomas Telford
Bridgnorth